The fourth season of the television series Xena: Warrior Princess commenced airing in the United States and Canada on September 28, 1998, and concluded on May 17, 1999, and contained 22 episodes.

The fourth season aired in the United States on the USA Network. The season was released on DVD as a ten disc boxed set under the title of Xena: Warrior Princess: Season 4 on June 15, 2004 by Anchor Bay Entertainment.

"The Way" was withdrawn from broadcast prior to its airing.  In response to this decision, a fan petition was circulated online and the episode was aired.

Episodes

References

1998 American television seasons
1999 American television seasons
Xena: Warrior Princess seasons